Tzvi (Tziki) Avisar (Hebrew: צבי (ציקי) אבישר; born September 16, 1978) is the founder and the chairman of Over The Rainbow – the Zionist movement, a World Zionist Congress faction.

Biography

Tzvi Avisar was born in Jerusalem.  
 
Avisar studied at Goldwater College in Eilat and was an active leader in the Likud Youth. He served in the Israeli Navy as a deputy ship captain.  Upon his release from the IDF at the end of 2000, he pursued his academic studies at the Hebrew University of Jerusalem in the Middle East and urban Geography program. During his studies, he landed a job at the Supreme Court's security section. He later formed and headed the intelligence department, which had the function of tracking down and dealing with threats made against Supreme Court judges and providing security during court sessions.

From 2001 he served as chairman of the student organization ("Social Justice") at Hebrew University which protested against the steady mistreatment of disadvantaged communities and welfare budgets cuts that were made in favor of adopting an aggressive capitalistic policy. In conjunction, he actively participated in the university program "Public Activists", which saw him volunteer in rundown neighborhoods and act as a mentor to children of low socio-economic backgrounds. Tzvi was also a delegate of the Beit Hillel movement for Jewish communities in Moscow and Kursk, Russia, with the intention of strengthening Jewish identity and Zionism among elderly Jews who struggled to lead a Jewish life under Soviet domination. He also participated in the Sadaka-Reut program  that seeks to promote dialogue between young Israeli and Palestinian leaders. 
 
Avisar served as an Advisor to Minister Eli Aflalo in the Ministry of Immigrant Absorption and adviser to Avi Dichter the Minister of Internal Security in Ehud Olmert’s government.

In 2005 he founded SkyTech, a software and consultancy firm in the field of internet content that provides services to government offices and public officials.

In November of 2005, after Ariel Sharon announced his decision to leave the Likud and form the Kadima party, Avisar was part of the professional team that ran the election campaign. He also established "Yallakadima" a very known political website that tracked and studied the events played out in Sharon's party throughout its existence.
 
In 2011, Avisar published the book Sharon, Five Years Forward (Hebrew), which covered the transformation in Sharon's political thinking when he made the decision to establish a new centrist party and the events taking shape after Sharon's debilitating stroke in January 2006. 
Since 2006, Avisar has been a delegate at the World Zionist Congress. He is actively involved in pro-Israel advocacy and has taken part in advocacy and coexistence missions around the world.

Establishment of Over The Rainbow

Avisar's decision to establish Over the Rainbow – the Zionist Movement, was born on the backdrop of observing the reality and the recent demographic tendencies of the Jewish people. The decision mainly rested on studies conducted by demographer Sergio DellaPergola from the Hebrew University of Jerusalem. In a global world, where most Jews do not live in Israel nor have any intention of immigrating to it, Avisar believed that the institutional Zionist Movement should adjust its goals to the present day and be attuned to reality.  It means that Zionism can no longer solely be expressed by immigration to Israel or by raising funds to Zionist projects in Israel, but rather by empowering Jewish communities, strengthening their ties to Israel, promoting advocacy for the state of Israel and encouraging them to continue and contribute to their living environment – while advocating collaborations with non-Jewish and even non-Zionist organizations in order to promote dialogue and understanding.
 
A year after its inception, the organization successfully established a foothold in nine countries and four continents, has contested in the elections for the 37th World Zionist Congress held in Jerusalem in October 2015, and won recognition as a faction with twelve representatives and four observers from around the world.
 
Avisar is married to Ayelet and are parents to Yuval, Ron and Alon.

References

Authored books

External links
 Over The Rainbow - the Zionist movement Official website 
 The World Zionist Congress website
 Sharon - Five years forward- Official author website 

1978 births
Living people
Israeli Jews
Jewish Israeli politicians
Politicians from Jerusalem
Zionist activists
Hebrew University of Jerusalem alumni
Businesspeople from Jerusalem